Nouria Yamina Zerhouni is an Algerian politician who served as governor of Boumerdès Province between 2015 and 2018.

Career
Zerhouni was appointed Minister of Tourism by president Abdelaziz Bouteflika in September 2013. In July 2015, she became governor of Bourmerdès.

References

Living people
Government ministers of Algeria
21st-century Algerian women politicians
21st-century Algerian politicians
Women government ministers of Algeria
Year of birth missing (living people)
21st-century Algerian people